C character classification is an operation provided by a group of functions in the ANSI C Standard Library for the C programming language. These functions are used to test characters for membership in a particular class of characters, such as alphabetic characters, control characters, etc. Both single-byte, and wide characters are supported.

History 
Early C-language programmers working on the Unix operating system developed programming idioms for classifying characters into different types. For example, for the ASCII character set, the following expression identifies a letter, when its value is true:

('A' <= c && c <= 'Z') || ('a' <= c && c <= 'z')

As this may be expressed in multiple formulations, it became desirable to introduce short, standardized forms of such tests that were placed in the system-wide header file ctype.h.

Implementation 
Unlike the above example, the character classification routines are not written as comparison tests. In most C libraries, they are written as static table lookups instead of macros or functions.

For example, an array of 256 eight-bit integers, arranged as bitfields, is created, where each bit corresponds to a particular property of the character, e.g., isdigit, isalpha. If the lowest-order bit of the integers corresponds to the isdigit property, the code could be written as

#define isdigit(x) (TABLE[x] & 1)

Early versions of Linux used a potentially faulty method similar to the first code sample:

#define isdigit(x) ((x) >= '0' && (x) <= '9')

This can cause problems if when the macro expands, the expression substituted for x has a side effect. For example, if one calls isdigit(x++) or isdigit(run_some_program()). It is not immediately evident that the argument to isdigit is evaluated twice. For this reason, the table-based approach is generally used.

Overview of functions 
The functions that operate on single-byte characters are defined in ctype.h header file (cctype in C++). 
The functions that operate on wide characters are defined in wctype.h header file (cwctype in C++).

The classification is evaluated according to the effective locale.

References

External links

C standard library